Alangkar is a 1978 Bangladeshi film directed by Narayan Ghosh Mita. The film received critical acclaim, particularly for the musical score given by Satya Saha and the songs performed by Sabina Yasmin, who won Bangladesh National Film Award for Best Female Playback Singer.

Cast
 Abdur Razzak
 Shabana

Music
All music were composed by Satya Saha. Songs were written by Gazi Mazharul Anwar, Mohammad Rafiquzzaman and Mohammad Moniruzzaman.

Track list

Awards
Bangladesh National Film Awards
Best Female Playback Singer - Sabina Yasmin

References

External links
 

1978 films
Bengali-language Bangladeshi films
Films scored by Satya Saha
1970s Bengali-language films
Films directed by Narayan Ghosh Mita